Žemliare is a village and municipality in the Levice District in the Nitra Region of Slovakia.

History
In historical records the village was first mentioned in 1075.

Geography
The village lies at an altitude of 151 metres and covers an area of 4.433 km². It has a population of about 155 people.

Ethnicity
The village is approximately 74% Magyar and 26% Slovak.

Facilities
The village has a public library and football pitch.

External links
http://www.statistics.sk/mosmis/eng/run.html

Villages and municipalities in Levice District